Khimlal Devkota is a Nepali politician belonging to Communist Party of Nepal (Maoist Center) and a Senior Advocate. Previously Devkota has served as the party spokesman of the Naya Shakti Party in Nepal.

Education and career 
Dr. Devkota was educated at Tribhuvan University and holds a bachelor's degree in Law and two master's degrees in Political Science and Sociology/Anthropology, respectively. He was a practicing lawyer at the Supreme Court of Nepal from 1990 to 2005. In 2006, he became a member of the Interim Constitution Drafting Committee and then the Interim Legislature Parliament of Nepal. In these roles, he was closely involved in law-making and the tough negotiating process to create a consensus in the political transition.

Political life 
He focused on finding solutions to such issues as army integration, monarchy dissolution, and Maoist inclusion in parliament. In 2008, he became a member of the Constituent Assembly of Nepal and, in 2009, a member of the Constitutional Committee of Nepal. Here, he acted as a drafting committee member and contributed as a member of the Taskforce for High Level Political Mechanisms in important negotiations. Furthermore, Mr. Devkota was the Chairperson of the National Intellectuals Organization of Nepal until 2015 where he was heavily involved in facilitating intellectual discourse on constitutionalism and good governance.

After Supreme Court decision on Nepal Communist Party, the party has divided in to two UML and Maoist Center. After that Mr. Devkota is a Central Committee Member of the Communist-Party-of-Nepal-Maoist-Centre in the position of Head of the Election Department. Mr. Devkota is a professional Lawyer, Senior Advocate of Supreme Court. He is policy analyst, Policy advisor and planner too. He is consulting National and International Organizations and Governmental Nongovernmental and diplomatic missions.

Mr Devkota is an Executive Committee Member of Nepal Law Society, which is known as think tank jurist organization facilitating to Government, Parliament and Judiciary including all Provincial and Local levels of Governments and Parliaments.

Books 
He is a writer, until now he has written almost 15 book mostly related to law and constitution. He is a professor at Institute of Crisis Management Studies affiliated with Tribhuvan University. Having a rich knowledge and experiences he is heavily engaged in research in Leadership Crisis in Nepal.

Finally, Mr. Devkota has widespread experience in presenting guest lectures and participation in seminars across the world and his frequent contributions to Gorkhapatra, The Kathmandu Post and others  National Daily are widely read. He has also been actively involved in the human rights movement of Nepal for more than two decades and has been published widely in the areas of constitutional, administrative, and human rights law. Mr. Devkota is currently a senior advocate for the Supreme Court of Nepal from his role as legal and constitutional adviser at Swabhiman Law Firm and Consultancy. He was the former leader of the Communist Party of Nepal (Maoist).

References

Living people
Nepalese socialists
Year of birth missing (living people)
Members of the National Assembly (Nepal)
Khas people
Members of the 1st Nepalese Constituent Assembly